is a Japanese actor and radio presenter. Since 2014, he hosted the Miss International pageant.

Filmography

Films
 Solar Crisis (1990), Ken Minami
 Godzilla vs. Mothra (1992),  Takuya Fujita
 Parasite Eve (1997), Yoshizumi Takatsugu
 Ultraman: The Next (2004), Shunichi Maki/Ultraman
 You are Umasou (Film) (2010), Baku
 Tatsumi (2011), voice
 Himawari no Oka 1983-nen Natsu (2015)
 Pure Japanese (2022)

TV series
 Dr X Surgery Daimon Michiko (2013, TV Asahi) 
 Gunshi Kanbei (2014, NHK), Yamanaka Shikanosuke
 Crow's Blood (2016, Hulu)

Radio
 J-Wave Tokyo Morning Radio (J-Wave) – 2009–present

Theatre
 The Fantastics (1987), Mortimer
 Glass Mask (1988), Yuu Sakurakouji
 When Harry Met Sally... (2002), Harry
 Les Misérables (2003–2011), Jean Valjean
 Miss Saigon (2004–2009), The Engineer
 Urinetown (2004–2011), Bobby Strong (2004), Officer Lockstock (2011)
 Here's Love (2004–2005), Fred Gaily
 NINE the Musical (2005), Guido
 The Woman in White (2007), Walter Hartright
 Opera do Malandro (2009), Max
 The Coast of Utopia (2009), Ivan Turgenev
 Wonderful Town (2010), Robert/Bob Baker
 A Moment to Remember (2010–2012), Choi Chul-soo
 Reading Millionaires' Rechita-Karuda "Yoshitsune" (2012)
 Last Dance -The Musical Koshiji Fubuki - (2012), Maki Kotaro 
 Hotel Majestic (2013), Ryuji Okochi
 Upheaval -GEKIDO- (2013), Naniwa Kawashima
 On The Stage crank ☆ Inn (2013), Orio Wakamura
 Carmen (2014), Mayor
 Sherlock Holmes 2: A Bloody Game (2015), Clive
 South Pacific (2015), Emile de Becque
 Love Letters (2016), Andy
 Death Note: The Musical (2017), Soichiro Yagami
 My Fair Lady (2018), Professor Henry Higgins

Others

 Miss International World Competition (2014–present), Host
 Miss International 2014 on November 11, 2014 at Grand Prince Hotel Takanawa with Kei Fujimoto
 Miss International 2015 on November 5, 2015 at Grand Prince Hotel Takanawa with Chisato Kaiho
 Miss International 2016 on October 27, 2016 at Tokyo Dome City Hall with Amy Ota
 Miss International 2017 on November 14, 2017 at Tokyo Dome City Hall with Amy Ota
 Miss International 2018 on November 9, 2018 at Tokyo Dome City Hall with Nikki
 Miss International 2019 on November 12, 2019 at Tokyo Dome City Hall with Ayoko Kisa and Kylie Verzosa

Bibliography

References

External links
  
 Pacific Voice profile
 
 2013 The Japan Times interview

1965 births
Living people
Japanese radio personalities
Keio University alumni
Actors from Shizuoka Prefecture
Japanese male film actors
Japanese male musical theatre actors
Japanese male television actors
20th-century Japanese male actors
21st-century Japanese male actors